Summit City, California may refer to:

 Meadow Lake, Nevada County, California
 Summit City, Shasta County, California
 Summit City canyon, forms the south face of the mountain Round Top in Alpine County, California
 Summit City Creek, a river in California